Malatipatapur is a village in Sadar Tehsil in Puri District of Odisha State. It is a small village located 6  KM towards North from District headquarters Puri and 53  KM from State capital Bhubaneswar. Odia is the local language here. Colleges near Malatipatpur
are Nayahat Mahavidyalaya, Mangal Moha Bidyalaya, kaktpur Mangala Mahavidyalaya, Pipilicollege, pipili, puri
Address : At-college Chak Near By Hatta Chak
Schools near Malatipatpur are Panchayat High School, Padmapur English Medium School, K.p.high School, Padmapur, Silad High School

Geography 
Puri, Jatani, Khordha, Bhubaneswar are the nearby Cities to Malatipatpur. It is near to bay of Bengal. There is a chance of humidity in the weather.

Demography 
Malatipatpur is surrounded by Puri Tahasil towards South, Satyabadi Tahasil towards North, Brahmagiri Tahasil towards west, Delanga Tahasil towards North .

Transportation  
Malatipatpur railway station, Jankidaipur Rail Way Station are the very nearby railway stations to Malatipatpur. How ever	Puri Rail Way Station is major railway station 8  KMnear to Malatipatpur

References 

Villages in Ganjam district